Gura Vadului is a commune in Prahova County, Muntenia, Romania. It is composed of three villages: Gura Vadului, Perșunari and Tohani.

References

Communes in Prahova County
Localities in Muntenia